13P/Olbers is a periodic comet with an orbital period of 69 years. It fits the classical definition of a Halley-type comet with (20 years < period < 200 years).

Heinrich Wilhelm Matthias Olbers (Bremen) discovered the comet on March 6, 1815. Its orbit was first computed by Carl Friedrich Gauss on March 31, Friedrich Bessel calculated an orbital period as 73 years, later as 73.9 years, calculations by other astronomers during that era resulted anywhere between 72 and 77 years.

The comet was last detected in 1956. It will next come to perihelion on June 30, 2024. the comet will be closest to the Earth on January 10, 2094 when it passes at a distance of 0.756 AU.

There is some speculation that 13P/Olbers has an associated meteor shower on Mars coming from the direction of Beta Canis Major.

References

External links 
 Orbital simulation from JPL (Java) / Ephemeris
 13P at Gary W. Kronk's Cometography
 13P at Kazuo Kinoshita's Comets
 13P at Seiichi Yoshida's Comet Catalog

Periodic comets
Halley-type comets
0013
013P
18150306